Spawn of the Desert is a 1923 American silent Western film directed by Louis King and starring William Fairbanks, Florence Gilbert and P. Dempsey Tabler.

Cast
 William Fairbanks as Duke Steele
 Florence Gilbert as Nola 'Luck' Sleed
 P. Dempsey Tabler as Silver Sleed
 Al Hart as Sam Le Saint

References

Bibliography
 Munden, Kenneth White. The American Film Institute Catalog of Motion Pictures Produced in the United States, Part 1. University of California Press, 1997.

External links
 

1923 films
1923 Western (genre) films
Films directed by Louis King
Arrow Film Corporation films
Silent American Western (genre) films
1920s English-language films
1920s American films